
The 2020 Major League Baseball All-Star Game would have been the 91st Major League Baseball All-Star Game. It was planned to be hosted on July 14 by the Los Angeles Dodgers, which would have been the second All-Star Game held at Dodger Stadium, following the 1980 All-Star Game, and the fourth hosted by the Dodgers. On July 3, the game was canceled due to the delayed start of the 2020 season, which began on July 23 due to the government restrictions imposed during the COVID-19 pandemic. It was the first cancellation since 1945, when the All-Star Game that year was not held in compliance with wartime travel restrictions at the time. Dodger Stadium was awarded the 2022 All-Star Game in its place. Fox and ESPN Radio were the game's respective planned television and radio partners.

Host selection
Bidding for the 2020 All-Star Game began in 2017. It was awarded on April 11, 2018, by MLB Commissioner Rob Manfred. It would have been the first time since 1980 that Dodger Stadium would serve as the game's host. The Hollywood-inspired logo for the game was unveiled on July 23, 2019, in a ceremony at Dodger Stadium, emceed by longtime Dodgers broadcaster Vin Scully.

Planned league managers and changes
As the manager of the previous season's American League champion Houston Astros, A. J. Hinch was originally designated as the manager for the American League All-Star team. On January 13, MLB suspended Hinch for the entire 2020 season for his role in the Houston Astros sign stealing scandal. Astros owner Jim Crane subsequently fired Hinch after the announcement. On January 29, it was announced that Hinch's successor, Dusty Baker, would manage the American League instead.  

Dave Martinez, manager of the 2019 National League champion Washington Nationals, was designated as the manager for the National League All-Star team.

Unofficial starters
Despite the game being cancelled, MLB.com released the players it believed deserved to be recognized as the "Unofficial 2020 All-Stars". The players selected by MLB.com are as follows:

National League

American League

See also
 List of Major League Baseball All-Star Games
 Major League Baseball All-Star Game Most Valuable Player Award
 All-Star Futures Game
 Home Run Derby

References

External links
 

Major League Baseball All-Star Game
All-Star
Baseball competitions in Los Angeles
21st century in Los Angeles
2020 in sports in California
Major League Baseball All-Star Game
MLB all-star game